The Kings River Open was a golf tournament on the LPGA Tour, played only in 1968.  It was played at the Kings River Country Club in Kingsburg, California. Kathy Whitworth won the event by 10 strokes over Sandra Haynie.

References

Former LPGA Tour events
Golf in California
Sports in Fresno County, California
Kings River (California)
Women's sports in California